Fatty aldehyde dehydrogenase (or Long-chain-aldehyde dehydrogenase) is an aldehyde dehydrogenase enzyme that in human is encoded in the ALDH3A2 gene on chromosome 17. 
Aldehyde dehydrogenase enzymes function to remove toxic aldehydes that are generated by the metabolism of alcohol and by lipid peroxidation.

Structure 

The ALDH3A2 belongs to the aldehyde dehydrogenase superfamily and is a membrane-associated protein typically containing 485 residues. The mature protein functions as a dimer. The structure was resolved using X-ray crystallography at 2.1 Angstrom resolution. It contains an element in the C-terminal region referred to as a "gatekeeper" helix, which is adjacent to the membrane-anchored transmembrane domain and the catalytic core. The gatekeeper helix appears to control access of molecular substrates to the catalytic core and allows efficient transit between membranes and catalytic sites.

Function 

ALDH3A2 catalyzes the oxidation of long-chain aliphatic aldehydes into fatty acids. It is known to act on a variety of both saturated and unsaturated aliphatic aldehydes between 6 and 24 carbons in length, as well as dihydrophytal, a 20-carbon branched chain aldehyde. It requires NAD+ as a co-factor. The encoded enzyme is responsible for conversion of the sphingosine 1-phosphate (S1P) degradation product hexadecenal to hexadecenoic acid. ALD3H2 is expressed in the human liver and has been found to localize the microsome fraction inside the cell.

At least two alternative splicing isoforms of ALDH3A2 are known to exist. The alternative transcript differs by an additional exon and anchors differently to the endoplasmic reticulum vs. the peroxisome

Clinical significance 

Mutations and deletions of in the ALDH3A2 gene have been widely associated with the autosomal recessive Sjögren-Larsson syndrome, an autosomal recessive neurocutaneous disease. Multiple mutations have been found in different families, including those that molecularly disrupts the protein dimerization interface or reduces mRNA stability. Absence or insufficiency of ALDH3A2 protein products in mutant cells are known to cause abnormal metabolism of sphingosine 1-phosphate to ether-linked glycerolipids and the abnormal accumulation of lipid precursors.

References

Further reading 
 

EC 1.2.1